Arcticibacter pallidicorallinus  is a Gram-negative and rod-shaped bacterium from the genus of Arcticibacter which has been isolated from glacier ice from a glacier in Xinjiang in China.

References 

Sphingobacteriia
Bacteria described in 2014